Michel Ducros (born 1949) is a French entrepreneur at the head of the French delicatessen company Fauchon, and yacht services company Monaco Marine. He is the former chairman and CEO of Ducros, a family business based on spices and mixed herbs, and still invest in several international companies.

Early life
Born in 1949 in Kehl, southwest Germany, from a father officer in the French army and a mother teacher, Michel Ducros was raised in Buis-les-Baronnies, a village in the Drome region of the southeast of France, where his grandfather harvested lime-tree leaves and lavender, used in herbalism. In 1963 his father Gilbert Ducros, and his uncle Marc Ducros, founded the eponymous family business that sold spices and mixed aromatic herbs.

Career path

At Ducros Company (1971 to 1992)
After he graduated from college in Paris, Ducros joined the family business in 1971, where he was successively sales manager, and then marketing director between 1971 and 1985, and launched the first TV advertising campaign of the company. He created foreign branches in Italy, Spain, Belgium, Portugal and Canada, and the company became the first spices brand in Europe. He became chairman of the company in 1986, until the sale of the Ducros company in 1992 to the Italian group Ferruzzi.

He created in 1976 the brand Vahiné, which became within ten years the first brand of ingredients for home-made pastry, and in 1981 the brand La Tisanière, the first French brand for herbal tea.

At Monaco Marine (since 1995)
Passionate sailor and dissatisfied with artisanal maintenance services, Ducros founded the company Monaco Marine in 1995, through the acquisition of a small company "PowerBoat" servicing yachts in the port of Monaco, which offered a marina service for berths, winter storage, and maintenance. Monaco Marine developed a network of shipyards in Saint Laurent du Var, Beaulieu sur Mer, Antibes and Cogolin, all in the south of France. He entered in 2002 into a partnership with the public company of the port of La Ciotat to build the largest dry paint shed in Europe and a maintenance and refit network for mega-yachting industry, inaugurated in September 2007. In 2012, Monaco Marine acquired a long-standing family shipyard in the region based in Antibes. Monaco Marine launched in 2016 a new shipyard in La Seyne, in the Toulon bay, that should open in September 2017.

Michel Ducros developed steadily Monaco Marine over the years : Monaco Marine had sales of 31 million Euros ($40 million) in 2003 and 50 million Euros ($60 million) in 2015, with nearly 200 employees.

At Fauchon (since 1998)

Ducros invested in Fauchon in 1998 along with other shareholders. He took first a minority interest (10%) in the company, and, at the request of the shareholders, will buy out most of the other shareholders until 2009, including the minority shareholdings, till holding almost all the capital. He became chairman and CEO of Fauchon in January 2004.

When he took the CEO job in 2004, Fauchon is on the verge of bankruptcy. Michel Ducros immediately attended to redress the operating imbalance, and repay the debts. Loss-making assets are sold and Fauchon cut back its workforce.

Michel Ducros set up a new Executive Committee to resolve the company's situation and organized the repositioning and new branding strategy, while developing the international presence. Balanced in 2009-2010 and out of debts, the brand increased its revenue, mainly abroad. Fauchon posted in 2013 an operating profit of €900,000 on sales of €50 million, with nearly thousand employees.

Eleven years after the takeover of Fauchon, Michel Ducros still strengthen the group and pursue the international development of the brand, which succeed its installation in the Middle East, where there are, in May 2016, 25 stores and restaurants.

In September 2015, Michel Ducros opt for a new strategy for Fauchon, and set up a joint venture to establish and manage its first five-star hotel in downtown Paris, Place de la Madeleine. It should open in January 2018 and aims to become the reference for the next Fauchon Hotels in the world.

Investment and shareholding
After the sale of the Ducros's family spice business by his father and his uncle, Michel Ducros started his own investments, taking a majority shareholding of a French lighting fixture retailer, Laurie Lumière, that he developed between 1991 and 2008.

He founded his own investment Holding, Eucelia Investments SA, in 1992, which enable Michel Ducros to create Monaco Marine and take stakes in Fauchon.

Michel Ducros develop companies in many fields, as real estate and frozen mushrooms, through the companies Immovalor S.C.A. and Magda SAS.

Public life 

Ducros is a resident of Yens, Switzerland. He is married to a French tax lawyer and he has four children. He appointed his son Tanguy at the head of the Monaco Site of his Monaco Marine Company. Ducros also hired his son-in-law, Samy Vischel, to run the Fauchon's expansion in the Middle East, India, Russia and Africa.

In 2010, Ducros is suspected for influence peddling, as part of a housing project and a retirement home in the town of La Ciotat. Twenty people have already been indicted and the case is still open.

Sources

External links
These are the main links to the companies specifically cited in the article above:
 Fauchon
 Monaco Marine

1949 births
Living people
French businesspeople
French expatriates in Monaco